Affiliated with the Suffering is the second studio album by Norwegian death metal band, Blood Red Throne.  The album was released on January 23, 2003.

Track listing 
 "Unleashing Hell"	(03:48)
 "A Dream of Death"	(03:46)	
 "Bleeders Lament"	(03:43)	
 "Mandatory Homicide / Death Inc."	(03:37)	
 "Razor Jack" 	(03:55)	
 "Chaos Rising!"	(03:27)
 "Gather the Dead"	(03:51)
 "Affiliated With the Suffering"	    (04:03)
 "Malediction"	(03:12)
 "Mercy Killings"	(03:35)
 "Deadly Intentions (Obituary cover)	(02:01)

2005 Bonus Tracks
 "Cryptic Realms"     (04:46)
 "Hate Tank"     (3:08)

Line-up 

Død: Guitar
Tchort: Guitar
Erlend Caspersen: Bass
Mr. Hustler: vocals
Espen "Beist" Antonsen – drums

2003 albums
Blood Red Throne albums